The knockout stage of the 2019 Cricket World Cup consisted of two semi-finals, played at Old Trafford in Manchester on 9 July and Edgbaston in Birmingham on 11 July, and a final, at Lord's on 14 July. It was the third time Edgbaston hosted a World Cup semi-final and the fourth at Old Trafford – a record for a World Cup venue.

Rules
All of the knockout games had a reserve day. If a reserve day came into play, the match would not be restarted but resumed from the previous day's play (if any). In the event of no play on the scheduled day or the reserve day, in the semi-finals, the team that finished higher in the group stage progressed to the final, and if no play were possible in the final, the trophy would be shared. If any match ended in a tie, a Super Over would be used to determine the winner; each team would select three batsmen and a bowler, with the full team available to field. There would be no penalty for the loss of a wicket, but the loss of two wickets would end the Super Over. If the scores in the Super Over were also tied, the winner would be determined by the two teams' overall boundary count, including both the match itself and the Super Over.

Qualification
On 25 June 2019, Australia became the first team to qualify for the semi-finals, after beating England at Lord's. India were next to qualify, thanks to victory over Bangladesh at Edgbaston on 2 July. The following day saw tournament hosts England become the third team to qualify, after they beat New Zealand at the Riverside Ground. New Zealand were the fourth and final team to qualify, after Pakistan were unable to increase their net run rate sufficiently enough in their match against Bangladesh at Lord's. As group winners, India faced fourth-placed New Zealand in the first semi-final, while the second semi-final will feature Australia and England, who finished second and third, respectively. The International Cricket Council (ICC) appointed the umpires for the two matches on 7 July.

Bracket

Semi-finals

Due to persistent rain, the first semi-final was suspended in the 47th over of New Zealand's innings, and continued on 10 July. New Zealand eventually posted a total of 239/8 from their 50 overs; in response, India were bowled out for 221, 18 runs short, sending New Zealand through to their second Cricket World Cup final, having also played in the final in 2015.

The second semi-final saw England take on Australia at Edgbaston. Australia won the toss and chose to bat first, but lost three of their top four batsmen for single-figure scores, two of them to Chris Woakes, to reduce them to 14/3 a ball into the seventh over. Steve Smith held his wicket to top-score with 85 as Australia were bowled out for 223 with Woakes and Rashid being the best of the bowlers with three wickets apiece. Nevertheless, England were well over halfway to their target by this point, and an unbroken partnership of 79 between Joe Root and captain Eoin Morgan saw them home to an eight-wicket victory and their first World Cup final since 1992.

Final

References

External links

2019 Cricket World Cup